Spirit Of Shankly (SOS) is the official supporters' union and leader of the supporters board for fans of Liverpool F.C. Named after former Liverpool manager Bill Shankly, the union was formed in early 2008 by disgruntled fans opposed to the former Liverpool F.C. ownership of Tom Hicks and George N. Gillett, Jr., quickly developing into a cooperative representing its members (and by implication other Liverpool F.C. supporters) on a whole range of issues such as ticketing, travel and community and regeneration issues. Its ultimate aim is to seek fan ownership of the club in the long term.

Background

In 2007 Liverpool were purchased by Tom Hicks and George Gillett, American businessmen, via a leveraged takeover from previous owner David Moores. The initial purchase was met with mixed reactions, with little immediate protest following increased on-pitch success and high quality purchases such as Fernando Torres.

However, from the 2008 season and amid mounting debts, waning on-pitch form and conflicts with manager Rafa Benitez, as well as a perceived reduction in transfer spending the popularity of the ownership of Hicks and Gillett began to fall. In January 2008 during the FA Cup game against Havant and Waterlooville when Liverpool were trailing 2-1 certain sections of the Kop Grandstand started singing 'Liverpool Football Club is in the wrong hands' it was met by a very loud disapproval and boos from the majority of the Kop. As a result, a meeting was called in The Sandon, a pub in Liverpool, to discuss what fans could do about the situation, those in favour of protest formed the Spirit Of Shankly group.

On Tuesday 12 October 2010 Spirit of Shankly organised a bus to the High Court in London for 4am on Wednesday 13th 2010 for Justice Christopher Lloyd's verdict regarding the court between Royal Bank of Scotland Versus Tom Hicks and others.

Aims

Spirit Of Shankly - Liverpool Supporters' Union after formation set out aims as part of their constitution highlighting short, medium and long-term objectives for the organisation. These are as follows:

Constant Aims
 To represent the best interests of our members and by extension the best interests of the supporters of Liverpool Football Club on both the local and international level.
 To hold whoever owns the football club to account.

Short Term Aims
 To institute a functioning structure for the Spirit Of Shankly.
 To create long lasting relationships with all aspects of Liverpool F.C.'s supporting community.
 To improve the quality of service for Liverpool F.C.'s supporters.
 To improve the standard and value of travel arrangements for Liverpool F.C.'s supporters.

Medium Term Aims
 To work with any relevant agencies to improve the area of Anfield.
 To build links with grassroots supporter groups both home and abroad.

Long Term Aim
 To bring about supporter representation at board room level.

Ultimate Aim
 Supporter ownership of Liverpool Football Club.

Protests

The union organised their first official protest against Hicks and Gillett on 22 February 2008. After learning that Tom Hicks Jr. was planning to attend the game, the members remained in the stadium singing anti-owner songs after the end of the match. In addition to this, many in the group began to display banners and sing in opposition to the ownership.

They were dubbed by Liverpool Managing Director Christian Purslow as 'Sons of Strikers'.

February 2010 saw the launch of a billboard campaign across Merseyside. The billboards had the message "Tom & George: Not Welcome Here" displayed, in reference to Tom Hicks and George N. Gillett, Jr., as well directing fans to join Spirit Of Shankly.

Tom & George - Not Welcome Anywhere

A "Tom And George - Not Welcome Anywhere" Campaign was started on 29 June 2010 to show the depth of feeling from Spirit Of Shankly members and Liverpool supporters all around the world. This saw pictures come in Anfield to Australia, Belfast to Bangkok. The pictures were reported in various media outlets from locally in the Liverpool Echo to Spanish newspaper Marca and to Tom Hicks' home town of Dallas

Spirit Of Shankly 4 July Independence Day Rally

A large number of Liverpool fans attended a SOS organised rally on St. George's Hall Plateau in Liverpool city centre, held on the American Independence Day, 4 July 2010. The union declared this the day that Liverpool fans declare their independence from their American owners. They outlined how they are planning to launch a credit union partnership where supporters can buy the club. The day included speeches in support of Spirit Of Shankly and their aims by ex-Liverpool players John Aldridge and Howard Gayle; Comedians John Bishop and Neil Fitzmaurice; Members of Parliament Steve Rotheram and Alison McGovern; General Secretary of the Communication Workers Union Billy Hayes (trade unionist); Karen Gill, the granddaughter of Bill Shankly; and music by John Power, Pete Wylie, Ian McNabb, Peter Hooton, John O'Connell and Sons of Anfield.

Tom Hicks Jr.

In January 2010 Liverpool director Tom Hicks Jr, son of owner Tom Hicks, became embroiled in an email row with a member of Spirit Of Shankly, in which he called the fan an idiot, before responding with a further reply which said: Blow me fuck face. Go to hell, I'm sick of you.. The precise circumstances of the exchanges between the two remain unknown; however, release of the emails was a publicity blow for the ownership. A spokesperson for SoS stated, "For one of the directors of the club, and the son of one of the owners, to respond to a fan with genuine concerns in such a manner is unacceptable. Tom Hicks Jr should resign, as his position as a director is now untenable.". The club released a statement confirming his resignation soon after.

Supporter ownership

On 23 July 2010, SoS and another fan organisation, ShareLiverpoolFC, announced that they would be joining forces to pursue their common goal of fan ownership of the club. ShareLiverpoolFC is to be rebranded as Spirit Of Shankly – ShareLiverpoolFC (SOS-SL), although it remains a legally separate organisation to Spirit of Shankly.

ShareLiverpoolFC decided to informally retire from its campaigning after the sale of the club to NESV leaving the Spirit of Shankly as the only organised supporters' group campaigning for supporter investment and ownership.

New ownership

It was unclear what impact the takeover by NESV in October 2010 would have on the future of the group. SoS released a statement claiming it was their actions which had forced Hicks and Gillett out.

On 18 October 2010 the board of Spirit of Shankly met the new owners of Liverpool F.C. for an informal discussion regarding their organisation and their actions regarding the previous regime. At that meeting new Liverpool owner John Henry said to the members of the group present "You guys need to know that without the action and hard work of the Spirit of Shankly, Tom (Werner) and I would not have bought the Club".

Media

On 18 June 2010, the Daily Mirror published an article urging fans to join Spirit Of Shankly in their fight against Hicks and Gillett. The increasing media exposure, not only from the Mirror but from the BBC and the Liverpool Echo, has seen the union increase its number of members as well as being contacted by Sky Sports News reporters on several big stories related to Liverpool F.C., such as the sacking of manager Rafael Benítez and the appointment of Roy Hodgson.

On 22 May 2012 the Daily Mirror published an article claiming that SoS is behind a campaign to have Rafael Benitez re-installed as manager after the sacking of Kenny Dalglish, Spirit of Shankly have denied any contact with either the Daily Mirror or Rafa Benitez regarding the job.

Awards
On 20 March 2014, SoS was named Cooperative Of The Year by the regional social enterprise organization, Social  Enterprise North West.

References

External links
 Spirit Of Shankly website

Liverpool F.C.
English football supporters' associations